Theresienfeld is a town in the Wiener Neustadt-Land district of Lower Austria, in eastern Austria. It lies 5 km (3 miles) north of Wiener Neustadt, in the southern part of the Vienna Basin. Of its 11.47 km2 area, 3.40% is forested.

Population

History

Theresienfeld was founded in 1763 by Empress Maria Theresa, for the agricultural development of the area.

Economy and education

In 2011, there were 169 non-agricultural jobs in the municipality, and 14 agriculturally and forestry related companies. 109 persons were unemployed.

Theresienfeld has two kindergartens, a primary school, and a vocational school.

References

External links
Official website

Cities and towns in Wiener Neustadt-Land District